Grandjean is a French surname. Notable people with the surname include:

Évelyne Grandjean (born 1939), French actress
Louise Grandjean (1870–1934), French soprano
Michel Grandjean, Swiss pair skater
Philippe Grandjean (1666–1714), French type engraver
Philippe Grandjean (professor), Danish-American health researcher
René Grandjean, Early Swiss pilot and aircraft designer
Silvia Grandjean, Swiss pair skater
:de:Etienne Grandjean, (1914-1991) Swiss physician, Professor of Hygiene and Ergonomics

Places
Grandjean, Charente-Maritime, commune in the Charente-Maritime department, France
Grandjean Fjord, NE Greenland
Grandjean House, Denmark

French-language surnames